Wu Tsang (born 1982 in Worcester, Massachusetts) is a filmmaker, artist and performer based in New York and Berlin, whose work is concerned with hidden histories, marginalized narratives, and the act of performing itself. In 2018, Tsang received a MacArthur "genius" grant.

According to Tsang, her films, videos, and performances look to explore the "in-betweeness" in which people and ideas cannot be discussed in binary terms. Generally, her films form a hybrid of narrative and documentary; they do not conform fully to one form or the other.

Her projects have been presented at the Tate Modern (London), Stedelijk Museum (Amsterdam), Migros Museum (Zurich), the Whitney Museum and the New Museum (New York), the MCA Chicago, and MoCA Los Angeles. In 2012 she participated in the Whitney Biennial, Liverpool Biennial and Gwangju Biennial.

Education 
Tsang received a B.F.A. (2004) from the School of the Art Institute of Chicago and an M.F.A. (2010) from the University of California at Los Angeles.

Work

Film 
Tsang's best-known documentary, Wildness, documents the Los Angeles trans bar "Silver Platter". Wu Tsang directed and produced the film. It was co-written with Roya Rastegar. The film was premiered at the MoMA Documentary Fortnight in New York and has been screened at festivals in Canada, the US, and Chile. Since 1963, "Silver Platter" has been a historic bar that patronised by a predominantly Latin LGBT community. Wildness documents what happens when a group of young artists host a weekly performance night at the bar. Documenting the collision between the two LGBT communities, the film poses questions about community, space, and ownership. In an interview, Tsang describes how this film represents a number of people who are often stereotyped, such as trans people, people of color, and queer communities, and she experiments with how to be accountable to the communities that she documents. Her collaborators include poet and scholar Fred Moten as well as performance artist boychild.

Short films
Wu Tsang's short films include:

 Under Cinema (2017): This film follows R&B singer Kelela along for a deep dive into the life of a black artist. The film is intimately shot on a handheld camera which follows Kelela through events such as a festival, studio time, and emotional reflections. "The most memorable moment of Under Cinema is when Kelela speaks to camera and eloquently dismantles the music industry by pointing out how it is ‘interested in … the currency of culture you come with as a person of colour’ and that ‘pop music comes from R&B, it’s a painful music."
 Duilian (2015): The film explores the life and writings of Qiu Jin, a Chinese feminist revolutionary who was executed at the age of 31 for attempting to foment revolution against the Qing dynasty. Lesser known, and highlighted in the film, is her long-term queer relationship with calligrapher Wu Zhuying. Wu Tsang plays Wu Zhuying, and long-time Wu Tsang collaborator, Boychild, plays Qiu Jin. The film illuminates the use of Qui Jin's poems (translated in english for the first time) and Wushu Martial Arts to create "jarring yet beautiful scenes."
 You're Dead to Me (2013): In suburban California, a Chicana mother is mourning the death of her teenage daughter two years earlier. On the eve of Dia de los Muertos, everything changes when Death offers her a choice she could not make in life. The cast includes Laura Patalano and Harmony Santana. The film was widely shown in LGBT and other film festivals, and won various awards, including best short and best actress.
 Tied and True (2012): Co-written with Nana Oforiatta-Ayim, the film takes place in a fictional post-colonial African city, inspired by Île Saint-Louis, Senegal. It tells the story of two star-crossed lovers while exploring the themes of assimilation, alterity and racism.
 Mishima in Mexico (2012): Starring Alex Segade and Wu Tsang, the film is inspired by the 1950 novel by Yukio Mishima, Thirst for Love. It takes place in Mexico City, where a writer and director check into a hotel together to work through their creative process, while integrating Mishima's work into their own, and into their lives.
 Wildness (2012): This film tells the story of the weekly party and clinic Tsang hosted at the Silver Platter bar in the MacArthur Park area of Los Angeles, California. The film is a "whimsically fictional account" of the events that transpired at the Silver Platter, and is narrated by both Tsang and (in Spanish) the Silver Platter. As Tsang stated in a 2016 interview, "The more subjective I could be in telling my own experience of the situation, the more ethical I could be to my subjects and collaborators." In an interview with Art Basel, Wu Tsang said she approached this film as more as an activist than a filmmaker. She continues by saying she "felt there was an important story to tell about the lives of [her] friends at the bar, many of whom were trans women and undocumented immigrants, often struggling with overlapping invisibilities, and thriving despite intense conditions of violence and policing." Wu Tsang describes the making of Wildness as a learning process in which she taught herself to "write, direct, and edit". Wildness premiered at The Museum of Modern Art's Documentary Fortnight in 2012, and Hot Docs Canadian International Documentary in Toronto.

Feature films 

 MOBY DICK; or, The Whale (2022): This is a 75-minute digital silent film accompanied by live orchestra. It is an adaptation of Herman Melville's 1851 classic Moby-Dick, with a post-colonial reading. It drew inspiration from C. L. R. James’s Mariners, Renegades, and Castaways: The Story of Herman Melville and the World We Live In, which studied the Melville work as related to colonialist greed and 1950s social hierarchy. Tsang's film depicts the ship's crew as having partially transcended gender and race, and features the main characters Ishmael and Queequeg as lovers. The film, supported by the Swiss theater Schauspielhaus Zürich, premiered in 2022, and was shown at the Thyssen-Bornemisza Museum in Madrid in 2023.

Art installations 

 Moved by the Motion (2014– 2015) - is the first in a series of performances and works by Tsang that inhabits a space between fiction and documentary. This was presented over the course of 2014–2015 including a live performance at DiverseWorks as part of CounterCurrent in collaboration with the University of Houston Cynthia Woods Mitchell Center for the Arts (Saturday, April 12, 2014) and a video installation in the exhibition Double Life at the Contemporary Arts Museum Houston (December 19, 2014 – March 13, 2015).

Awards and honors
In 2012, Tsang was named one of Filmmaker Magazine'''s "25 New Faces of Independent Film". At Outfest 2012, Wildness won the Grand Jury Award for Outstanding Documentary. Also in 2012, her work was featured in the Whitney Biennial and the New Museum Triennial. She won the Foundation for Contemporary Arts Grants to Artists award (2013). In 2014, she was included in the Hammer Museum's 2014 "Made in L.A." biennial. In 2015 she received a Creative Capital Award for A Day in the Life of Bliss. Tsang received the MacArthur Genius Award in 2018.

Filmography
 Wildness''
Mishima in Mexico
Tied and True
You're Dead to Me
Duilian
Under Cinema

See also
 List of transgender film and television directors

References

External links
 

 http://wildnessmovie.squarespace.com/storage/Dean%20Spade%20make-shift%20web.pdf "Wildness" essay by Dean Spade
 http://wildnessmovie.squarespace.com/storage/WB%2712_Tsang.pdf "Wildness" essay by Wu Tsang in the Whitney Biennial Catalogue
 http://wildnessmovie.squarespace.com/storage/nifstc_wu%20roya.pdf A Conversation between Wu Tsang and Roya Rastegar
 Sister of the sword: Wu Tsang, the trans artist retelling history with lesbian kung fu
Interview with Art Basel

American performance artists
American LGBT artists
American LGBT people of Asian descent
Queer artists
LGBT film directors
Transgender artists
Living people
Performance art in Los Angeles
University of California, Los Angeles alumni
American artists of Asian descent
Artists from Los Angeles
American contemporary artists
LGBT people from California

21st-century American artists
MacArthur Fellows
1982 births